A-Nal-Y-Sis is the fifth and final album by the Louisville, Kentucky group The Nite-Liters, the instrumental ensemble offshoot of New Birth, featuring Tony Churchill, James Baker, Robin Russell, Austin Lander, Robert "Lurch" Jackson, Leroy Taylor, Charlie Hearndon and Carl McDaniel.    Released in 1973 on RCA Records. Produced by mentor Harvey Fuqua.

Track listing
"Serenade for a Jive Turkey" (Robin Russell) -  	 4:52   	
"Anything Goes" (Harvey Fuqua, Leroy Taylor) -	2:44 	
"The Happy Hooker" (Instrumental) 	4:19 	
"Craaaashing" (Charles Hearndon, Harvey Fuqua, James Baker, Rodney Vorhis) -	2:23 	
"Damn" (Charles Hearndon) -	3:44 	
"Valdez in the Country" (Donny Hathaway) -	2:44 	
"Drumology" (Robin Russell) -	7:38 	
"Cowboy" (Robert Jackson) -	4:46 	
"Excuse Me While I Do My Thing" (Charles Hearndon) -	3:56 	
"Pee-Foul" (Austin Lander) -	2:52

Charts

References

External links
 The Nite-Liters-A-Nal-Y-Sis at Discogs

1973 albums
The Nite-Liters albums
RCA Records albums
Albums produced by Harvey Fuqua